Henri Roessler  (16 September 1910 – 18 September 1978) was a French football player and manager.

He played as a defender for AS Strasbourg, AS Troyes-Savinienne, RC Strasbourg, Red Star, EF Reims-Champagne and Stade de Reims.

He coached Stade de Reims, Olympique de Marseille and AS Aix.

Honours

Player
Red Star
 Coupe de France: 1942

Manager
Reims
 Coupe de France: 1950

References

External links
 
 
 Profile

1910 births
1978 deaths
French people of German descent
Association football defenders
French footballers
France international footballers
ES Troyes AC players
RC Strasbourg Alsace players
Red Star F.C. players
Stade de Reims players
Ligue 1 players
Ligue 2 players
French football managers
Stade de Reims managers
Olympique de Marseille managers
Pays d'Aix FC managers